Cristián José Molina Varela (born 19 March 1978) is a Chilean former footballer who played as a striker.

Career
In his career, Molina mainly played for Deportes Antofagasta. In 2004, he joined Universidad de Chile, where he just made one appearance. In the second half 2004, he moved to Indonesia and joined Persib Bandung. He returned to Chile in 2005 and played for Deportes Antofagasta (2006–07) and Deportes La Serena (2007).

Personal life
Following his retirement, he switched to work in the mining industry in Antofagasta.

References

External links
 

1978 births
Living people
People from Antofagasta
Chilean footballers
Chilean expatriate footballers
C.D. Antofagasta footballers
Universidad de Chile footballers
Persib Bandung players
Deportes La Serena footballers
Primera B de Chile players
Chilean Primera División players
Indonesian Premier Division players
Chilean expatriate sportspeople in Indonesia
expatriate footballers in Indonesia
Association football forwards